Kate Lynne Thwaites (born 19 January 1980) is an Australian politician. She is a member of the Australian Labor Party (ALP) and has been a member of the House of Representatives since the 2019 federal election, representing the Division of Jagajaga in Victoria. She was a journalist and public servant before entering parliament.

Early life
Thwaites was born in Melbourne on 19 January 1980. Her father was a lawyer and her mother was a schoolteacher.

Thwaites grew up in the suburb of Rosanna. She holds the degrees of Bachelor of Arts and Master of International Development from RMIT University.

Career
In 2002, Thwaites began working at 2CUZ, an Indigenous community radio station in Bourke, New South Wales. She later worked for ABC News until 2008, when she joined Oxfam Australia as a media adviser. She later worked as a senior adviser to Labor MP Jenny Macklin and as communications director at the Victorian Department of Health and Human Services. She also worked with the National Disability Insurance Agency in Geelong.

Politics
In July 2018, Thwaites won Labor preselection for the Division of Jagajaga, following Macklin's retirement. According to The Guardian, her victory was "almost a direct result of [Josh] Burns' win in Macnamara, with the Labor left concerned about its female representation". She retained Jagajaga for the ALP at the 2019 federal election with a small positive swing. Thwaites was returned as the member for Jagajaga at the 2022 Federal Election with an increased margin of over 62% of the two party preferred vote.

References

1980 births
Living people
Australian Labor Party members of the Parliament of Australia
Labor Left politicians
Members of the Australian House of Representatives
Members of the Australian House of Representatives for Jagajaga
Women members of the Australian House of Representatives
RMIT University alumni
Australian journalists